Raymond Griffin (born June 26, 1956) is a former American football cornerback. He is the younger brother of former two-time Heisman Trophy winner Archie Griffin, and also played college football with the Ohio State Buckeyes and pro football for the Cincinnati Bengals.

Ray set up the winning touchdown in the 1975 Michigan-Ohio State rivalry game, by intercepting a Rick Leach pass with the score tied at 14-14.  Griffin returned the ball to inside the 10 yard line of Michigan, leading to fullback Pete Johnson's winning TD.  This winning score put the Buckeyes into the 1976 Rose Bowl

References

1956 births
Living people
Players of American football from Columbus, Ohio
American football defensive backs
Ohio State Buckeyes football players
Cincinnati Bengals players
Ohio State University alumni